The year 1995 was the 214th year of the Rattanakosin Kingdom of Thailand. It was the 50th year of the reign of King Bhumibol Adulyadej (Rama IX) and is reckoned as the year 2538 in the Buddhist Era.

Incumbents
King: Bhumibol Adulyadej
Crown Prince Vajiralongkorn
Prime Minister: 
until 19 May: Chuan Leekpai
starting 19 May: Banharn Silpa-Archa
Supreme Patriarch: Nyanasamvara Suvaddhana

Events
 9 December–17 December – The Southeast Asian Games are held in Chiang Mai.

Births

Deaths
18 July - Srinagarindra Thai Princess Mother (b. 1900)

References

 
Years of the 20th century in Thailand
Thailand
Thailand
1990s in Thailand